Kotaka may refer to:

Ships
Japanese gunboat Kotaka, a river gunboat of the Imperial Japanese Navy
Japanese torpedo boat Kotaka, a torpedo boat of the Imperial Japanese Navy

People with the given name
, Japanese educator

People with the surname
George Kotaka (born 1977), American kareteka
, Japanese weightlifter

Japanese-language surnames